Okenia purpureolineata is a species of sea slug, specifically a dorid nudibranch, a marine gastropod mollusc in the family Goniodorididae.

Distribution
This species was described from Okinawa, Ryukyu Islands, Japan.

Description
This Okenia has a narrow body and seven pairs of long lateral papillae. There are two papillae on the mid-line of the back, in front of the gills. The body is translucent purple and there is a network of dark purple lines on the back running from in front of the rhinophores to behind the gills.

Ecology
The diet of this species is the ctenostome bryozoan, Amathia sp.

References

Goniodorididae
Gastropods described in 2004